This is a list of lighthouses in Bangladesh.

Lighthouses

See also
 Lists of lighthouses and lightvessels

References

External links
 

Bangladesh
Lighthouses
Lighthouses

Lighthouses